Friedensruh is a community in the Canadian province of Manitoba. It is located in the Rural Municipality of Stanley.

Unincorporated communities in Pembina Valley Region